The Polytechnic Institute of Cávado and Ave,, is the youngest polytechnic institute in Portugal. It was created on December 19, 1994, in Barcelos, with two higher Schools: the Management School and the Technology School.

The Management School provides four degree courses: Accounting and Public Finance, Management Accounting, Taxation and Solicitorship.
The Technology School provides four degrees as well: Health Informatics, Graphic Design, Industrial Design and Management Information Systems.

As of 2007 both schools counted over 1400 students enrolled in the various courses degrees available.

External links

Portuguese
 IPCA

Polytechnics in Portugal
Buildings and structures in Braga District
Educational institutions established in 1994
1994 establishments in Portugal
Buildings and structures in Barcelos, Portugal